Uniunea Producătorilor de Fonograme din România (Ro for Romanian Phonographic Industry is the Romanian record industry's trade association. It also measures the number of physical and digital sales of records in Romania.

Sales certificates

Music charts

References 

Romanian music
Music industry associations
Music organizations based in Romania